One is the debut and only album released by Australian pop music duo Sister2Sister.

Track listing
 "Sister" – 3:26
 "Differently" – 3:24
 "Never Like That" – 3:45
 "What's a Girl to Do?" – 3:27
 "Tender" – 3:52
 "Too Many Times" – 3:17
 "How Could You Doubt Me?" – 4:02
 "Friend of Mine" – 4:14
 "Too Close to Heaven" – 4:20
 "Count on Me" – 3:57

Charts

Weekly charts

Year-end charts

Certifications

Release history

References

2000 debut albums
Sister2Sister albums